Jubril Adesope Okedina (born 26 October 2000) is an English professional footballer who plays for Cambridge United as a defender.

Early and personal life
Born and raised in Woolwich, Okedina attended Beths Grammar School in Bexley.

Career
After beginning his career at Tottenham Hotspur, Okedina signed on loan for Cambridge United in January 2021. He made his senior debut on 12 January 2021, playing in the EFL Trophy against Oxford United. Okedina signed permanently to Cambridge in August 2021. Okedina signed a new three-year contract in July 2022.

Personal life
Born in England, Okedina is of Nigerian descent.

Career statistics

References

2000 births
Living people
English footballers
English people of Nigerian descent
Tottenham Hotspur F.C. players
Cambridge United F.C. players
Association football defenders
English Football League players
Black British sportspeople